Barringtonia neocaledonica is a tree in the family Lecythidaceae. It is endemic to New Caledonia.

Gallery

References

External links
 
 See images of Barringtonia neocaledonica on Flickriver

Flora of New Caledonia
neocaledonica
Taxa named by Eugène Vieillard
Plants described in 1866